The Savoyard state is a term of art used by historians to denote collectively all of the states ruled by the counts and dukes of Savoy from the Middle Ages to the formation of the Kingdom of Italy. At the end of the 17th century, its population was about 1.4 million.Geoffrey Symcox. "Victor Amadaeus II: Absolutism in the Savoyard State, 1675-1730." Page 245.Gregory Hanlon. "The Hero of Italy: Odoardo Farnese, Duke of Parma, his Soldiers, and his Subjects in the Thirty Years' War." Routledge: May 2014. Page 87. Piedmont's population is given at 700,000, and Savoy's at 400,000 in 1630; Aosta and the County of Nice are not listed.

History 
The multi-century history of Savoy included the period before the County of Savoy, then the County of Savoy, the Duchy of Savoy, the period from Savoy to Sicily and Sardinia before Italian unification, and thereafter.

From the Middle Ages, the state comprised the Duchy of Savoy, the Principality of Piedmont, the Duchy of Aosta and the County of Nice, all of which were formally part of the Holy Roman Empire. However, the Savoyards often acted against the Emperor, repeatedly siding with the French during the Franco-Habsburg Wars. From 1708, it included the Duchy of Montferrat, then the Kingdom of Sicily from 1713 until 1720, the Kingdom of Sardinia from 1720, and the Duchy of Genoa from 1815. These territories formed a composite state under the House of Savoy until the Perfect Fusion union in 1847. By 1861, this unified state had acquired most of the other states on the Italian peninsula and formed the Kingdom of Italy, while its territories north and west of the Alps (including Savoy proper) became part of France.

The Final Act of the Congress of Vienna of 1815 refers to them as the "States of His Majesty the King of Sardinia". Among contemporaries, "Kingdom of Sardinia" and "Sardinia" were used as common short forms, even though they were confounded with the island. "Piedmont", "Savoy-Piedmont" and "Piedmont-Sardinia" are also sometimes used to emphasise that the economic and political centre of the Savoyard state was the Piedmont since the late Middle Ages. The seat of the rulers was in Turin. Each state had its own institutions and laws.

Territory

Flags

References

States and territories established in 1003
Savoy
 
Former countries in Europe
 
1861 disestablishments in Europe